Jan Doležálek (born 23 May 2002) is a Czech athlete who specializes in the hammer throw. He was the gold medallist at the World Athletics U20 Championships in 2021.

References

External links 

 

2002 births
Living people
Czech male hammer throwers
World Athletics U20 Championships winners
Sportspeople from Pardubice